= Speed limits in Kazakhstan =

Informational sign showing the standard speed limits for cars in Kazakhstan

The general speed limits in Kazakhstan are as follows:

In built up areas;

For vehicles: 60 km/h

For trucks and buses: 50 km/h

In residential areas and yard areas: 20 km/h

Outside built up areas;

Type of road	Limit		
Type of road	Motorcycles and cars	Trucks with a permitted maximum weight not exceeding three thousand five hundred kilograms, intercity buses, and minibuses	Other buses including ones carrying out organised transportation of groups of children, automobiles with trailers, and trucks with a permitted maximum weight exceeding three thousand five hundred kilograms
Motorways	140 km/h (87 mph)	110 km/h (68 mph)	90 km/h (56 mph)
Roads with a dividing strip	110 km/h (68 mph)	100 km/h (62 mph)	80 km/h (50 mph)
Other roads	100 km/h (62 mph)	90 km/h (56 mph)	70 km/h (43 mph)

Other speed limits of;

When transporting passengers in the back of a truck: 60 km/h

When towing motor vehicles: 50 km/h

When agreeing on the conditions for the transportation of dangerous, heavy and bulky cargoes: the prescribed value

also apply.
